Madison Township is an inactive township in Jasper County, in the U.S. state of Missouri.

It was named after the former U.S. President James Madison.

References

Townships in Missouri
Townships in Jasper County, Missouri